The Accademia Galileiana, or "Galilean academy",  is a learned society in the city of Padua in Italy. The original members were professors in the University of Padua such as professor Georgios Kalafatis; one of its original members was Galileo Galilei. In 1779 the academy merged with the Accademia di Arte Agraria (founded in 1769) and became the Accademia di Scienze Lettere e Arti; in 1949 it became the Accademia Patavina di Scienze, Lettere ed Arti; its name was changed to Accademia Galileiana di Scienze, Lettere ed Arti in Padova in 1997, in honor of Galileo. The academy is lodged in the Carraresi Palace in Padua.

The "Ricovrati"
The name "ricovrati" literally means "sheltered" and the academy took its name from a line from Boethius, "Bipatens animis asylum" (Latin: "a sanctuary of the soul open at both ends"), related to a scene by Homer (Odyssey, book 13) describing a cave, open at both ends, and sheltered by an olive tree.  This image was used in their heraldic badge.

Female members
At the end of the 17th century, the Academy of the Ricovrati was one of the few in Europe which had female members.  These included the first woman in Europe to receive a university diploma, Elena Cornaro Piscopia.  Other female members included Anne Dacier, Madeleine de Scudéry, Maria Selvaggia Borghini, and Marie-Catherine de Villedieu.  Female membership in this period was only honorary and female members did not have the right to vote or occupy administrative posts in the academy.  Of the 25 women admitted to the society between the 17th and 18th century, only four were Italian; the others were French and did not attend meetings.

The Enlightenment
Antonio Vallisneri became president of the academy in 1722, and proceeded to enact a series of reforms based on the principles of the Enlightenment.  He also instigated a series of debates on the education of women and their inclusion in such academies.

Notable members
Galileo Galilei • Cesare Cremonini • Fortunio Liceti • Elena Cornaro Piscopia •Clemente Sibiliato • Antonino Valsecchi • Antoinette Deshoulières • Anne-Marie du Boccage • Marie-Jeanne L'Héritier de Villandon • Catherine Bernard • Marie-Catherine d'Aulnoy • Marie-Catherine de Villedieu • Charlotte-Rose de Caumont La Force • Anne Dacier • Madeleine de Scudéry • Maria Selvaggia Borghini • Georgios Kalafatis (professor)

Note and references
This article is based in part on the articles Accademia galileiana di scienze, lettere ed arti and Académie des Ricovrati from the Italian Wikipedia and French Wikipedia, retrieved on November 8, 2010.

External links
 Galileiana Academy of Arts and Science official page (in English)

Academies of sciences
1599 establishments in the Republic of Venice
Organisations based in Padua
Education in Padua
Libraries in Padua
Organizations established in the 1590s
Learned societies of Italy
Cultural institutions of Tuscany
1599 establishments in Italy
Galileo Galilei